Lakeview  is a neighbourhood in Mississauga in the Region of Peel, just east of Port Credit, which amalgamated into the Town of Mississauga in 1968. It is located in the extreme southeastern corner of the city, along the northern shores of Lake Ontario.

Lakeview was known for the 4 Sisters, the four smokestacks of the former Lakeview Generating Station. They were called the 4 Sisters because the generating plant actually had eight boilers and two boilers were 'sistered' to a common stack. The generating station was demolished in 2007, about a year after the four stacks were demolished, which occurred on the morning of June 12, 2006. At 493 ft each they were easily the tallest structures in the area.

Along the shore of Lake Ontario, Lakeview is the home of the Port Credit Yacht Club, Lakefront Promenade Marina, Arthur P. Kennedy Water Treatment Plant, and G. E. Booth (Lakeview) Wastewater Treatment Plant.

The area is also home to the Lakeview Branch Library, and two high schools: Cawthra Park Secondary School, and St. Paul Secondary School. (A third, Gordon Graydon Memorial Secondary School, closed.) Many parks run along Lake Ontario, including well-lit baseball diamonds used by many junior leagues.

History

Lakeview is part of the Mississauga Purchase of 1806, lands acquired by the Crown from the Mississauga First Nation. Portions of the eastern section of the Lakeview was part of the Colonel Smith Tract, which was added to lands Colonel Samuel Smith had acquired in 1801 in neighbouring Etobicoke. The area later became Toronto Township which was restructured into the Town of Mississauga in 1968.

Lakeview was the site of the Long Branch Armory, which included a rifle range, training facilities and the Long Branch Aerodrome, the first commercial air training airport in Canada. The airport was run by the Curtiss Aviation School, and was located west of the namesake Long Branch neighbourhood in Toronto. The Lakeview location is documented by the presence of Aviation Road running south off Lakeshore Road just west of Cawthra Road. The site is further acknowledged by a historic plaque. The site was home for several World War II arms and munitions plants during World War II. One large munitions factory in Lakeview was staffed almost exclusively by women during World War II.

Long Branch Aerodrome 

The Long Branch Aerodrome was located west of Long Branch on the Federal Government lands in Toronto Township (today's Mississauga). The aerodrome was situated on a 100-acre property on Lakeshore Road just west of Dixie Road. The Long Branch Aerodrome has the distinction of being the first Aerodrome in Canada and home to Canada's first aviator training school. It opened on May 20, 1915, by Curtiss Aeroplanes and Motors Company for the Royal Flying Corps. Aircraft such as the Curtiss JN-4 "Jenny" soon became a common sight at the airfield, which included three aircraft hangars.

In January 1917, the newly designated Royal Flying Corps, Canada, the forerunner to the Royal Canadian Air Force, opened the RFC Training Centre at Long Branch. The Long Branch training centre also provided instruction on flying boats at nearby Hanlan's Point on Toronto Islands, the first seaplane base in Canada. By July 1917, the flight school re-located to the Armour Heights Aerodrome. Long Branch became the Cadet Ground Training School for the Royal Flying Corps. Both the school and the aerodrome closed in 1919. During World War II, the former aerodrome served initially as Non-Permanent Active Militia's No 21 Training Centre and then as an army small arms training centre (Long Branch Rifle Ranges).  After the war, the Lakeview Armoury was established on the site but was demolished in the 1950s.

Not the slightest trace remains of the airfield today. From 1962 - 2005, the waterfront portion of the property was the location of Ontario Power Generation's Lakeview Generating Station.  In September 1969, a plaque was erected at the site to commemorate Canada's first Aerodrome.

Small Arms Limited,  Long Branch Arsenal

Adjacent to the west side of Marie Curtis Park (now Marie Curtis Park West or Lakeshore Park) in Toronto Township is the former site of the Small Arms Limited Long Branch Arsenal. The Federal Government had owned the lands south of Lake Shore Road, between the Etobicoke River to just west of Cawthra Road, from the late 1800s into the early 20th-Century. The first land purchase was made in 1889 for a rifle range, to replace the one at New Fort York. The military use was expanded for World War I, becoming the summer quarters for several regiments and a staging area for troops to go overseas.

The Ordnance Branch of the Department of National Defence authorized the construction of a factory on the site in 1940.  After transfer to the Department of Munitions and Supply, a Crown Corporation, Small Arms Ltd. was formed to operate the facility. By June 1941, the first five rifles had been produced. Huge quantities of British-pattern military small arms were manufactured there during the Second World War, including the No.4 MkI* Lee–Enfield bolt-action rifle, and the Sten submachine gun (or machine-carbine). Small Arms Ltd. ceased operations at the end of December 1945. Beginning January 1, 1946, operations continued as the Small Arms Division, Canadian Arsenals Limited under the Department of Supply and Services. The factory was closed June 30, 1976. The property was later used by Canada Post as a distribution centre.

The factory complex was demolished and the "Arsenal Lands" are now being used for the stockpiling of landfill for use in future aquatic park development. The lands are slated to eventually become part of Lakeshore Park. The buildings of the office complex at the foot of Dixie Road were saved for public use, while only the water tower remains from the factory complex.

Lakeview Waterfront Connection

Prior to 1958, the lands used by Lakeview GS and the old rifle range had been farmland since the 1870s. The Halliday and Hamilton families purchased several plots from the Samuel Smith Tract, which was once owned by Samuel Smith, to the west of the rifle range. The rifle range had been occupied by the Canadian Army since 1891 when they moved from the old Garrison Common in Toronto. After 1958 infilling was needed to create the outer edge of the power plant and including some portions south of the old rifle range.

In September 2016 the City of Mississauga, along with Peel Region, and local MPP Charles Sousa announced plans to redevelop the area surrounding the
old Lakeview Generating Station into a mixed-use area along with a  waterfront park by 2023-2026 timeframe. 
 
Peel Region and Credit Valley Conservation Authority will manage the project and Toronto and Region Conservation Authority will provide assistance.

Serson Creek and Applewood Creek will each have a naturalized mouth featuring wetlands. The area south and east of the G.E. Booth Wastewater Treatment Plant will be infilled (similar to Leslie Spit in Toronto) in to create a new waterfront park featuring, cobbled shoreline and three man-made rock islands that will act as break walls.

The new parkland area will have trails that will connect to neighbouring Marie Curtis Park in Toronto as well as existing parks (R.K.McMillan Park, A.E. Crookes Park, Lakefront Promenade, Douglas Kennedy Park and Lakeview Park) in Mississauga.

The area of the old generating station will be reserved for future residential and commercial use but will allow space near the water to be accessible and connected by trails to the park to the east.

Transportation
Port Credit and Long Branch GO stations
Queen Elizabeth Way
Miway routes 5 Dixie, 8 Cawthra and 23 Lakeshore

Notable persons

Harland "Colonel" Sanders, founder of the Kentucky Fried Chicken chain, lived in the area (1337 Melton Drive near Dixie Road and Queensway) part-time from 1965 to 1980 during the time he was overseeing the Canadian operations.

See also
Port Credit, Ontario
Lorne Park
Meadowvale, Ontario
Malton, Ontario

References

Source Material:  - Historic Plaques of Peel, information provided by Eric Gibson, The Mississauga Heritage Foundation (2004), the personal recollections of Tim Baetz, resident of Midland area (2004), "History of Canadian Airports" by T. M. McGrath, Ontario Power Generation web site - www.opg.com/ops/lakeviewfinal.pdf & the personal recollections of the author (2004).

External links
 Inspiration Lakeview
PDF of Lakeview: Journey from Yesterday by Kathleen A. Hicks

Neighbourhoods in Mississauga